Nicole Hanselmann (born 6 May 1991) is a Swiss racing cyclist, who currently rides for UCI Women's Continental Team . She rode at the 2014 UCI Road World Championships.

References

External links
 

1991 births
Living people
Swiss female cyclists
People from Uster
Sportspeople from the canton of Zürich
21st-century Swiss women